Nelson Federico Insfrán (born 24 May 1995) is an Argentine professional footballer who plays as a goalkeeper for San Martín de Tucumán, on loan from Gimnasia y Esgrima.

Club career
Insfrán made his professional debut with Gimnasia y Esgrima in a 1-1 Argentine Primera División tie with Banfield on 29 November 2019. Insfrán received a yellow card for timewasting, and a red card for a penalty given without contact; the cards were overturned by tribunal in December 2019.

In January 2022, Insfrán joined Central Córdoba SdE on a one-year loan. However, the spell was terminated on 3 August 2022 and Insfrán was instead loaned out to Primera Nacional side San Martín de Tucumán until the end of 2022.

References

External links

1995 births
Living people
People from Clorinda, Formosa
Argentine sportspeople of Paraguayan descent
Argentine footballers
Association football goalkeepers
Argentine Primera División players
Club de Gimnasia y Esgrima La Plata footballers
Central Córdoba de Santiago del Estero footballers
San Martín de Tucumán footballers